Discula cheiranthicola is a species of air-breathing land snail, a terrestrial pulmonate gastropod mollusk in the family Geomitridae.

This species is endemic to Madeira, Portugal.

References

Discula
Molluscs of Madeira
Endemic fauna of Madeira
Taxonomy articles created by Polbot